Christopher George Hewett (5 April 1921 – 3 August 2001) was an English actor and theatre director best known for his role as Lynn Aloysius Belvedere on the ABC sitcom Mr. Belvedere.

Career
Hewett was born in Worthing, Sussex to Christopher Fitzsimon Hewett (an army officer and a descendant of Daniel O'Connell), and his wife Eleanor Joyce Watts (an actress whose professional name was Rhoda Cleighton).  He was educated at Beaumont College and at Wimbledon College, and at aged 7, made his acting debut in a Dublin stage production of A Midsummer Night's Dream. At age 16 Hewett joined the Royal Air Force, leaving in 1940. Hewett then joined the Oxford Repertory Company and made his West End theatre debut in 1943.

He later appeared on Broadway in the musicals My Fair Lady, First Impressions, The Unsinkable Molly Brown, Music Is and Kean and in the plays Sleuth and The Affair, among others, and directed the 1960 Broadway revue From A to Z and the 1967 Off Broadway revival of the Rodgers and Hart musical By Jupiter. Hewett also directed several stage productions including The Marriage-Go-Round and Beyond the Fringe and Camelot.

Hewett made his film debut in the crime drama Pool of London (1951), and later appeared in roles on Robert Montgomery Presents and DuPont Show of the Month. He appeared as the grandiose and camp theatre director Roger DeBris in Mel Brooks's comedy The Producers (1967). In 1976, Hewett played the generic bureaucrat Federov in the short-lived sitcom Ivan the Terrible. During the 1979-80 season he played Captain Hook to Sandy Duncan's Peter Pan on Broadway. From 1983 to 1984 he portrayed Lawrence, Mr. Roarke's (Ricardo Montalbán) sidekick on the final season of the ABC series Fantasy Island.

The following year, Hewett landed his best-known role as Lynn Aloysius Belvedere, an English butler who works for a middle class American family in the sitcom Mr. Belvedere. After the series ended its run in 1990 Hewett appeared in a guest spot on an episode of the NBC teen sitcom California Dreams in 1994. His last on-screen role was a cameo appearance on the Fox series Ned and Stacey in 1997.

Personal life and death
A devout Catholic and lifelong bachelor, Hewett served at St. Victor's Church in West Hollywood. During his later years, he suffered from arthritis and diabetes.

Hewett died on 3 August 2001, in his Los Angeles home from complications of diabetes at age 80.

Filmography

Award nomination

See also

 List of Worthing inhabitants

References

External links
 
  
 
 
 

1921 births
2001 deaths
20th-century English male actors
Deaths from diabetes
English male stage actors
English male film actors
English expatriates in the United States
English people of Irish descent
English Roman Catholics
English male television actors
English theatre directors
People from Worthing
Royal Air Force personnel of World War II
People educated at Wimbledon College
Burials at Brookwood Cemetery